This is a list of topics related to Boone County, Illinois.

Places

Communities

Cities
 Belvidere

Villages
 Caledonia
 Capron
 Cherry Valley (mostly in Winnebago County)
 Poplar Grove
 Timberlane

Census-designated places
 Argyle
 Beaverton Crossroads
 Blaine
 Candlewick Lake
 Edgewood
 Garden Prairie
 Herbert
 Hunter
 Irene
 Prairie View
 Russellville

Townships
Boone County is divided into these nine townships:

 Belvidere
 Bonus
 Boone
 Caledonia
 Flora
 Leroy
 Manchester
 Poplar Grove
 Spring

Education

 Harvard Community Unit School District 50
 Hiawatha Community Unit School District 426
 North Boone Community Unit School District 200
 Rockford School District 205
 Belvidere Community Unit School District 100
Belvidere North High School
Belvidere High School (Illinois)
Rock Valley College

Churches
Willow Creek Presbyterian Church, Argyle

Structures

Illinois Route 76
Illinois Route 173
Interstate 90 in Illinois
Kenosha and Rockford Railroad
U.S. Route 20 Business (Rockford, Illinois)
U.S. Route 20 in Illinois
National Register of Historic Places listings in Boone County, Illinois
Lampert-Wildflower House
Old Belvidere High School (Belvidere, Illinois)
United States Post Office (Belvidere, Illinois)
Pettit Memorial Chapel
Belvidere North State Street Historic District
Belvidere South State Street Historic District
Poplar Grove Airport
Ida Public Library

Landforms

Kishwaukee River
Tributaries of the Kishwaukee River
Piscasaw Creek (Kishwaukee River)
Rush Creek (Kishwaukee River tributary)
Beaver Creek (Kishwaukee River tributary)
Killbuck Creek (Kishwaukee River tributary)
North Branch Kishwaukee River
South Branch Kishwaukee River
Mokeler Creek
Bessie Creek (Kishwaukee River tributary)
Lawrence Creek (Kishwaukee River tributary)
Owens Creek (Kishwaukee River tributary)
Coon Creek (Kishwaukee River tributary)
Kishwaukee River State Fish and Wildlife Area
White Rock Moraine

Historical periods
Mississippian culture
Upper Mississippian culture

People
Potowatomi
Mascouten
Mound Builders

Daniel Boone
John Wesley Powell

Argyle
George Armour, early Argyle resident

Belvidere
Othman A. Abbott, Nebraska politician who grew up in Belvidere and served in Illinois cavalry regiment 
Lucien Lester Ainsworth, Iowa politician who was a lawyer in Belvidere for a year
Carrie Thomas Alexander-Bahrenberg
Alfred Elisha Ames
Philip Arbuckle
List of George Franklin Barber works, architect, designed 15 historic houses in Belvidere
Leo Binz, Catholic pastor in Belvidere, later Archbishop in MN
Frank Bishop, infielder for the Chicago Browns
Emory S. Bogardus, sociologist
William D. Boies, Iowa politician born in Belvidere
Elmer Ellsworth Brown, principal at Belvidere High School, later US Commissioner of Education
Albert Cashier
Joe Charboneau, outfielder and designated hitter for the Cleveland Indians
Robert A. Childs, politician raised in Belvidere, part of Hurlbut's company 15th IL regiment, briefly lawyer there
Reuben W. Coon, publisher of the Belvidere Northwestern and state's attorney for Boon County
Thomas Neill Cream, Scots-born serial killer convicted of poisoning in Belvidere
Myron Henry Feeley, Canadian politician, born in Belvidere
John J. Foote
Judith Ford, 1969 Miss America
Allen C. Fuller
Charles Eugene Fuller, U.S. Congressman
DuFay A. Fuller
Jack D. Franks, politician born in Belvidere
Jeanne Gang, architect
William Matthias Georgen, basketball player, captain of national champions Chicago Maroons 1908-1909
Boyd Hill, Oklahoma territory coach
Stephen Augustus Hurlbut (1815-1882), politician and Union commander in the Civil War
Noyes L. Jackson, Illinois politician
Kasey James, WWE wrestler
Mike Junkin, NFL football player from Belvidere
John Lawson (baseball)
Amanda Levens, women's college basketball player and coach
Edwin A. Miller, Wisconsin politician
Richard S. Molony, Belvidere doctor who became a politician, buried in Belvidere cemetery
Mary L. Moreland, Congregationalist minister
Charles H. Parker, Beloit politician who lived in Belvidere
Lowell Holden Parker, Wisconsin legislator, son of above
Stan Patrick, basketball player, died in Belvidere
Rowland Salley, musician born in Belvidere
Albert Charles Schaeffer, mathematician
Fred Schulte, outfielder for the St. Louis Browns, Washington Senators and Pittsburgh Pirates
Kurt Sellers, wrestler with the WWE (as K.C. James and James Curtis)
Cris Shale, football player, lives in Belvidere
Rob Sherman, atheist activist, pilot who died in area plane crash
James A. Slater, entomologist at the University of Connecticut
Joe Sosnowski, current IL representative
Ted Strain, Harvard Hornets and UW basketball player, died in Belvidere
Roger Charles Sullivan, Illinois politician born in Belvidere
Scott Taylor (racing driver)
Horace Mann Towner, Iowa politician and Governor of Puerto Rico, born in Belvidere
Cornelius Mortimer Treat, school administrator
James Waddington, Wisconsin State Senator
Ronald A. Wait, Illinois politician
Frederick Wolf, Episcopal bishop, priest of Holy Trinity Church in Belvidere

Caledonia

Glenn W. Birkett
John Early (politician)
Murder of Peggy Johnson, Jane Doe murder victim originally buried in Caledonia, now in Belvidere

Capron
Zeke Markshausen NFL player
Horace Capron, village named for him

Cherry Valley
Virgil Abloh
John Baumgarten
Leroy M. Green
Mo Pitney

Garden Prairie
A. A. Ames, Minnesota politician, born in Garden Prairie
Washington Porter, farmer and real estate entrepreneur, born and raised in Garden Prairie

Loves Park

Dick Kulpa
Robin Zander

Russellville
Laura Andrews Rhodes, opera singer raised in Russellville

Organizations
15th Illinois Infantry Regiment
95th Illinois Infantry Regiment
Belvidere Standard daily newspaper (available on newspapers.com)
Belvidere Daily Republican daily newspaper (available on newspapers.com)
Belvidere Assembly Plant
Boone County Historical Society
Boone County Museum of History
Poplar Grove Wings and Wheels Museum
Chrysler Motors
Dean Foods
General Mills
Rockford Park District
National Sewing Machine Company
Angelic Organics
The Real Dirt on Farmer John
Illinois's 16th congressional district
	•	State House District 69
	•	State Senate District 35
WIFR-LD
WXRX
Elgin and Belvidere Electric Company
Galena and Chicago Union Railroad
Stroh's Ice Cream
Eldredge (automobile)
Metalith
Prairie Cat Mastering
Hilander Foods

Events

1967 Oak Lawn tornado outbreak
2007 Midwest flooding
January 2008 tornado outbreak sequence
2015 Rochelle–Fairdale, Illinois tornado
August 2020 Midwest derecho
Tornado outbreak sequence of May 15–20, 2017
Nihon Dempa Kogyo, Japanese company, quartz crystal manufacturer; 2009 Belvidere plant explosion

Other
Christmas club

Boone County, Illinois